Ebbett is a surname. Notable people with the surname include:

Andrew Ebbett (born 1983), Canadian ice hockey player
Arthur Ebbett (1866–1929), Canadian lawyer and politician

See also
Ebbets